MacArthur's mouse lemur (Microcebus macarthurii), or the Anjiahely mouse lemur, is a species of mouse lemur known only from Makira Natural Park in northeastern Madagascar.

The species is named in honor of the founder of the MacArthur Foundation, which financed the studies that included the discovery of this species.

References

External links

Mammals described in 2008
Mouse lemurs